Czech Republic competed at the 2015 World Championships in Athletics in Beijing, China, from 22–30 August 2015.

Medalists

Results
(q – qualified, NM – no mark, SB – season best)

Men
Track and road events

Field events

Combined events – Decathlon

Women 
Track and road events

Field events

Combined events – Heptathlon

Sources 
Czech team
15th IAAF World Championships Results

Nations at the 2015 World Championships in Athletics
World Championships in Athletics
2015